There were two special elections in  in 1806; one on September 15, 1806 to fill a vacancy caused by the resignation of Joseph Bryan (DR) earlier that year, and the other sometime before December 6, 1806 to fill a vacancy caused by the resignation of Thomas Spalding (DR) earlier that year.

Election results

Smelt took his seat on December 26, 1806

See also
List of special elections to the United States House of Representatives

References

Georgia 1806 At-large
Georgia 1806 At-large
1806 At-large
Georgia At-large
United States House of Representatives special
United States House of Representatives 1806 at-large